Crematogaster aitkenii is a species of ant in tribe Crematogastrini. It was described by Forel in 1902.

References

aitkenii
Insects described in 1902